Antonis Parayios (born 15 August 1929) is a Greek former professional footballer who played as a defender. His nickname was the "Little Lion", due to his fighting spirit. He is the oldest living veteran footballer of AEK Athens.

Club career
Parayios started his football career in 1943 at Posidon Glyfada. In 1948, at the age of 19 he was signed by AEK Athens. In his first season he won the Greek Cup, playing in the final 2–1 win at the extra time against Panathniakos at Leoforos Alexandras Stadium. On 28 May 1950 he won his second cup in a row against Aris in a 4–0 win at the same stadium. He won the cup of his career on 24 June 1956 in the 2–1 victory over Olympiacos. With AEK he won 3 Cups and an Athens FCA League in 1950. A serious knee injury forced him to end his career in 1957, at the age of only 28.

International career
Parayios became an international with Greece, making 2 appearances  in 1950 and 1951. He made his debut on 13 December 1950 in the 1–0 defeat against France B at Leoforos Alexandras Stadium. His last international appearance was on 14 October 1951 in the friendly match against the same opponent at the Stade Vélodrome, where Greece lost again with the same score.

Personal life
Parayios is married to Kyriaki, whose origin is from Asia Minor. He was one of the 23 veteran football players of AEK who were honored at the opening of the Agia Sophia Stadium.

Honours

AEK Athens
Greek Cup: 1948–49, 1949–50, 1955–56
Athens FCA League: 1950

References

External links
"The History of AEK", Edition "G.Ch. Alexandris, Athens 1996Greece's march through time, Papazisis Publications'' Athens 2001

1929 births
People from Karpathos
Greece international footballers
Association football defenders
AEK Athens F.C. players
Super League Greece players
Greek footballers
Sportspeople from the South Aegean
Living people